Konstantinos Anyfantakis (born 29 October 1971) is a Greek professional football manager.

References

1971 births
Living people
Greek football managers
Kavala F.C. managers
Panthrakikos F.C. managers
Ionikos F.C. managers
Veria NFC managers
Doxa Drama F.C. managers
Footballers from Rethymno